Sirsho Banerjee or Sirsho Bandopadhyay (1967–2021) was an Indian journalist and writer of Bengali origin. He worked for many years at Deutsche Welle, in both Cologne and Calcutta. He also worked at various West Bengal media outlets, such as Aajkal, Star Ananda, etc.

As a writer, he was best known for his novel Shardul Shundori, translated by Arunava Sinha with the title Tiger Woman. He also wrote Ether Sena about the 1971 Bangladesh Independence War and ghost-wrote Shondha Raater Shefali about the famous Calcutta cabaret dancer Arati Das.

He died suddenly at his Goriahat home in May 2021.

Works

 সন্ধ্যারাতের শেফালি
 শার্দুলসুন্দরী
 তেরো নদীর পারে
 এক নম্বর পাঁচু মিস্ত্রি লেন
 রমণীরতন
 ব্লগবকম
 ইথারসেনা
 মাউন্ট রাধানাথ
 প্রিন্স গোবর গোহো
 গণপতি দ্য গ্রেট

References

Indian writers
1967 births
2021 deaths
Writers from West Bengal